The yellow-breasted bowerbird (Chlamydera lauterbachi) also known as Lauterbach's bowerbird, is a medium-sized, approximately 27 cm long, bowerbird with a brownish-olive upperparts plumage, grayish-yellow upper breast, coppery crown, dark brown iris, yellow underparts, a black bill and pinkish-orange mouth. Both sexes are similar. The female is duller than the male.

Habitat 
The yellow-breasted bowerbird is distributed in mainland New Guinea, where it inhabits the grasslands, lowlands, and subtropical mountain forests. Its diet consists mainly of fruits, caterpillars, beetles, and other insects. The nest is a shallow cup made of small sticks up in a tree. The bower itself is that of "avenue"-type with four walls of sticks and an outward-angled main avenue walls.

The scientific name commemorates its discoverer, the German botanist Carl Lauterbach. He discovered this bowerbird in 1896.

Widespread and a common species throughout its habitat range, the yellow-breasted bowerbird is evaluated as Least Concern on the IUCN Red List of Threatened Species.

References

External links

 BirdLife Species Factsheet

yellow-breasted bowerbird
Birds of New Guinea
yellow-breasted bowerbird